Blessed Be This Nightmare is Eternal Lord's first and only full-length album. It was released on 17 March in the United Kingdom through Golf Records and 18 March in the United States on Ferret Records.

Track listing

Personnel 
 Ed Butcher - Vocals
 Chris Gregory - Guitar
 Shaun Zerebecki - Guitar
 Nick Gardner - Bass
 Stuart Mackay - Drums, Mixing & Production
 Sons of Nero - artwork

2008 debut albums
Albums with cover art by Sons of Nero
Eternal Lord albums